Ixora jucunda is a species of flowering plant in the family Rubiaceae. It is endemic to Sri Lanka.

Leaves
Large, oval to lanceolate, acute ends.

Trunk
Branchlets stout with nodal thickenings.

Flowers
White or pink, sweet-scented, calyx often red; Inflorescenece - large cymes.

Fruits
Globose berry.

Ecology
Rain forest understory of wet zone.

Uses
Ornamental.

References

External links

World Checklist of Rubiaceae

jucunda
Flora of Sri Lanka
Vulnerable plants
Taxonomy articles created by Polbot